The 2006 Internationaux de Strasbourg was a women's tennis tournament played on outdoor clay courts. It was the 20th edition of the Internationaux de Strasbourg, and was part of the Tier III category of the 2006 WTA Tour. The tournament took place at the Centre Sportif de Hautepierre in Strasbourg, France, from 22 May until 28 May 2006. Second-seeded Nicole Vaidišová won the singles title and earned $28,000 first-prize money.

Finals

Singles

  Nicole Vaidišová defeated  Peng Shuai 7–6(9–7), 6–3

Doubles

  Liezel Huber /  Martina Navratilova defeated  Martina Müller /  Andreea Vanc 6–2, 7–6(7–1)

External links
 ITF tournament edition details 
 Tournament draws

2006 WTA Tour
2006
Internationaux de Strasbourg
Internationaux de Strasbourg
Internationaux de Strasbourg